TaskFreak! is an open-source, web interface, time and task management tool. It was created in 2005 as a standalone web application. It has been ported to a WordPress plugin in 2013.

See also

 Task management
 Taskwarrior

References
 project start date/first version
 taskfreak contributors
 licence and creator

External links
 TaskFreak! main page
 WordPress plugin
 TaskFreak! on the FSF free software directory
 Source code on GitHub

Administrative software
Task management software
Free task management software
Free personal information managers
Cross-platform free software
WordPress